Paddy Smith may refer to:
Patrick Smith (politician) (1901–1982), Irish politician
Paddy Smith (baseball) (1894–1990), Major League Baseball player

See also
Patrick Smith (disambiguation)